Tamra Borchardt-Slayton is a Paiute politician and the chairperson and leader of the Paiute Indian Tribe of Utah.

Tenure

During her tenure as chairperson, the tribe launched the Paiute Educational Access Camp Experience, a summer camp at Southern Utah University that engages tribal youth around STEM. The program was launched with a grant from the Church of Jesus Christ of Latter-day Saints. She was an advocate for the Bigham Young University Arts Partnership that teaches history for elementary school children through art.  

Borchardt-Slayton was a supporter of the Missing Murdered Indigenous Women and Girls Legislation for Utah and was named as a member of the affiliated task force. Her work was included in the inaugural report of the U.S. Department of Justice's Operation Lady Justice initiative. The report quotes Borchardt-Slayton stating:

Borchardt-Slayton as an avid supporter of MMIW/MMIP was sparked by her own personal story to seek justice for her aunt, Kris Jake-Moon and the other families and communities that continue to grieve and mourn due to the injustice that take place for the victims and their families. 

Borchardt-Slayton supports the renaming of Utah landmarks and sports teams that are offensive to Native peoples, such as those that use the word squaw, including legislative efforts by state representative. Following the 2020 election of Joe Biden, she endorsed Deb Haaland for secretary of the Department of the Interior.

References

External links

"Geneal Anderson, Leader of the Paiute Indian Tribe of Utah" by Tamra Borchardt-Slayton 

Southern Paiute people
21st-century American women politicians
21st-century American politicians
Native American leaders
Utah politicians
Native American women in politics
Living people
1987 births
20th-century Native American women
20th-century Native Americans
21st-century Native American women
21st-century Native Americans
Female Native American leaders
Native American people from Utah